"Night Reconnaissance" is a song by American dark cabaret duo The Dresden Dolls. It was released as the only single from their album No, Virginia....

Theme 

The song centers around a girl who lived in a rich suburban neighborhood as a child, and was a victim of bullying. The song implies that she has become an aspiring script writer, basing her films' characters on the personas and prejudgments assumed to her by the bullies, which she hopes will be directed by Steven Spielberg. She attempts to get back at all the people who had done her harm by stealing garden gnomes and other various lawn ornaments from the homes in her old town. Soon however, she develops a strong emotional attachment to the stolen ornaments.

Video 

The video mostly follows the storyline summarized above. It was directed by Michael Pope and filmed mostly on Amanda Palmer's parents' front lawn.

Personnel 

 Amanda Palmer – piano, organ, vocals, lyricist
 Brian Viglione – drums, guitar, backing vocals

References 

2008 singles
The Dresden Dolls songs
2008 songs
Roadrunner Records singles
Songs written by Amanda Palmer